In enzymology, a L-erythro-3,5-diaminohexanoate dehydrogenase is an enzyme that catalyzes the chemical reaction

L-erythro-3,5-diaminohexanoate + H2O + NAD+  (S)-5-amino-3-oxohexanoate + NH3 + NADH + H+

The 3 substrates of this enzyme are L-erythro-3,5-diaminohexanoate, H2O, and NAD+, whereas its 4 products are (S)-5-amino-3-oxohexanoate, NH3, NADH, and H+.

This enzyme belongs to the family of oxidoreductases, specifically those acting on the CH-NH2 group of donors with NAD+ or NADP+ as acceptor.  The systematic name of this enzyme class is L-erythro-3,5-diaminohexanoate:NAD+ oxidoreductase (deaminating). This enzyme is also called L-3,5-diaminohexanoate dehydrogenase.  This enzyme participates in lysine degradation.

References

 

EC 1.4.1
NADH-dependent enzymes
Enzymes of unknown structure